The 2022 UCLA Bruins softball team represented the University of California, Los Angeles in the 2022 NCAA Division I softball season.  The Bruins were coached by Kelly Inouye-Perez, in her sixteenth season.  The Bruins played their home games at Easton Stadium and competed in the Pac-12 Conference.

Personnel

Roster

Coaches

Schedule

|-
! colspan=2 style=""| Regular Season: 36–5
|- valign="top" 
|

|- 
|
 
|- 
|

|-
|

|- 
|- style="text-align:center;"
|   
|}

Rankings

Awards and honors

All-tournament Team

The following players were members of the Women's College World Series All-Tournament Team.
 Megan Faraimo 
 Delanie Wisz
 Maya Brady

References

UCLA
UCLA Bruins softball seasons
UCLA Bruins softball
UCLA Bruins softball
UCLA
Women's College World Series seasons